Mn/Thuya Josephvaz Maha Vithiyalayam, Vidathaltheevu is a school in Northwestern Sri Lanka, located near the 400-year-old St James' church at Vidathaltheevu. At the beginning, the school was named as Mn/Vidathaltheevu Roman Catholic Tamil Mixed School.

History
Prior to 1900, the playground land of St.James Church was donated by the Jaffna Roman Catholic diocese to construct a primary school. This therefore confirms that the school was built before the year 1900. 

Catholic students in the school, but also other religious people who lived in the local community have been taught by the school. It is believed that the primary school was taken over by the government on 03/06/1918.

With the guidance of the Catholic priests and other ancestors, perseveres school up to grade 10, in time for the completion of the college and is proud to grow in a few years. 

In 1960 the school was taken over by the government. At the presence of Vidathaltheevu born Principal Mr. Thiruchchelvam some new buildings were built and some old buildings were renovated with the help of the parents teacher society.

In 1968 the United National Party ruled the country. According to their schools reconstruction planning they lowered the grade to 7 and ordered to shift the 8th, 9th, 10th students to the neighboring Muslim school. When the parents and students of the school complained due to this, Pesalai born Mr. Silvester Antony Thuram was appointed as the principal. By this principal’s intense efforts, the corporation of Vidathaltheevu born vice principal Mr. Benedicts, Vidathaltheevu born teacher Mr.Soosaipillai and the help of the parents the efforts to upgrade up to 10th level were achieved.

Then again in 1969 the school was upgraded to class 10. In 1970 temporary injunction granted by the Ministry of Education of the ruling United National Party to upgrade the school up to 10th grade. In view of increasing the land area of our school some private lands were donated to school by the land owners. 

At the presence of Vidathaltheevu born principal Mr.Santhiyapillai on 1972 the school ground was reconstructed. This responsibility was given to Vidathaltheevu born teacher Mr. Emmanuel. He did the reconstruction work with the help of youths from the village. In his presence the science lab was also established.

By 1973 the Musical Society of the school was formed and Mr. Anthony Muthu was appointed as teacher in charge. Under his authority several drama programs were staged in Mannar District successfully.

External links
 Vidattaltivu

References
1."Samooha Ozli" book published on 1974 by Vidathaltheevu West Sanasamooha nillaiyam

2. The Chronicle of the Sanctuary of Our Lady of Madhu (up to 1950) with the Life and Labours of the Missionaries Connected with it by. A.J.B.Antaninus

3.Christianity in Sri Lanka under Portuguese By. Martin Quere. O.M.I

Schools in Mannar District